Anton Crișan (17 January 1942 – 9 March 2012) was a Romanian ice hockey player. He competed in the men's tournament at the 1964 Winter Olympics.

References

1942 births
2012 deaths
Olympic ice hockey players of Romania
Ice hockey players at the 1964 Winter Olympics
People from Sebeș